Carlo Fontana may refer to:

 Carlo Fontana (1634 or 1638–1714), was an Italian architect
 Carlo Fontana (sculptor) (5 October 1865 – 16 November 1956), was an Italian sculptor.